London was a 76-gun second-rate ship of the line in the Navy of the Commonwealth of England, originally built at Chatham Dockyard by shipwright John Taylor, and launched in June 1656. She gained fame as one of the ships that escorted Charles II from Holland back to England during the English Restoration, carrying Charles' younger brother James Duke of York, and commanded by Captain John Lawson.

London was accidentally blown up in 1665 and sank in the Thames Estuary. According to Samuel Pepys 300 of her crew were killed, 24 were blown clear and survived, including one woman. Lawson was not aboard at the time of the explosion but many of his relatives were killed. The wreck is a Protected Wreck managed by Historic England.

Active service
London was launched from Chatham Dockyard in June 1656. She was commissioned in 1657 under the authority of Rear-Admiral Richard Stayner and first put to sea in 1658 under the command of Captain William Whitehorne as acting commander-in-chief of Commonwealth forces in The Downs. Stayner resumed direct command of London in 1659, remaining in The Downs.

In 1660 on the Restoration of the English monarchy in 1660, the vessel passed bloodlessly back into Royalist hands. The ship was part of the fleet, commanded by Stayner, that brought King Charles II back to England from his exile on the continent. The royal convoy left from Scheveningen on 23 May and landed in Dover on 26 May. While the king sailed on the flagship, London carried his younger brother James, Duke of York, the future King James II, as her principal passenger.

Nominal command was vested in Captain and later Vice-Admiral John Lawson from 1660 to 1664. Thereafter, London was the flagship of Admiral Edward Montagu and directly commanded by flag-captain Jonas Poole.

The ship was lost on 7 March 1665. She had been briefly transferred back to John Lawson's command for the purpose of bringing her from Chatham to the Thames, when her powder magazine was accidentally ignited. The subsequent explosion caused immense damage, leaving little but wreckage on the surface of the river. On hearing of the loss, Samuel Pepys wrote on 8 March 1665 that:

The precise cause of the explosion is unknown. Another letter, this time to Henry Bennet, 1st Earl of Arlington, passed on coffee-house gossip which blamed the easy availability of gunpowder ’20s a barrel cheaper than in London’ and therefore by implication suspect in provenance and quality. On 9 March, John Evelyn, the other famous diarist of the period, ‘went to receive the poor creatures that were saved out of the London frigate, blown up by accident, with above 200 men,’ for he had been appointed one of the Commissioners for sick and wounded seamen by Charles II.

On 11 March Pepys also recorded the results of an inspection of the wreck by Sir William Batten and Sir John Mennes: "out of which they say, the guns may be got, but the hull of her will be wholly lost." Those guns continued to be the focus of administrative attention for 30 years afterwards: recoveries made in 1679 caused controversy when the salvor attempted to leverage their return as payment of an unrelated debt.

Rediscovery of wreck
The wreck of London was rediscovered in 2005, resulting in port authorities changing the route of the shipping channel to prevent further damage and to allow archaeologists from Wessex Archaeology led by Frank Pope to investigate. The site where the remains lie was designated under the Protection of Wrecks Act 1973 on 24 October 2008.  The wreck is considered important partly for its historical references and partly for its insight into an important period in British naval history.  Although the Port of London Authority had voluntarily taken action to reduce the risk of damage to shipping, the removal of bronze cannon from the site without any archaeological investigations being carried out showed that the site was at risk of destruction through looting and hence required immediate protection.

On 12 August 2015, a gun carriage was lifted from the seabed off Southend-on-Sea which was described by Historic England as being in near-perfect condition, and important to England's knowledge of its social and naval history.

The wreck is at on-going risk of loss through erosion, so between 2014 and 2016 a licensed programme of surface recovery and limited excavations (funded by Historic England) took place, with around 700 small finds recovered, almost half of which were made of wood. A report on the wooden finds was published in 2019 as was a further report on copper alloy and tin alloy objects, which included an urethral syringe. Historic England also commissioned an updated Conservation Management Plan for the London protected wreck site in 2016, which was published in 2017.

An exhibition of finds recovered from the London including one of the cannons was held at Southend Central Museum between 22 September 2018 and 20 July 2019.

In September 2019 a German parachute mine from World War II was removed from the wreck.

References

Bibliography 

Lavery, Brian (2003) The Ship of the Line – Volume 1: The development of the battlefleet 1650–1850. Conway Maritime Press. .
Winfield, Rif (2009) British Warships in the Age of Sail 1603–1714: Design, Construction, Careers and Fates. Seaforth Publishing. .

External links 

"London" National Heritage List for England

Coordinates on Wikidata
1650s ships
1665 disasters in England
2005 archaeological discoveries
2005 in England
Disasters in Essex
Maritime incidents in 1665
Protected Wrecks of England
Ships of the line of the Royal Navy
Shipwrecks of the River Thames
Thames Estuary